Wesley "Wes" Clapp was an American football coach.  He was the head football coach at Kalamazoo College in Kalamazoo, Michigan.  He held that position for the 1904 season. His coaching record at Kalamazoo was 1–6.

References

Year of death missing
Year of birth missing
Kalamazoo Hornets football coaches